Euphorbia curtisii, known by the common names of Curtis' spurge and sandhills spurge, is a member of the spurge family, Euphorbiaceae. It is a perennial herb, native to the southeastern United States, from the southern coast of Alabama to central North Carolina.

References

curtisii
Flora of the Southeastern United States